96.7 One FM (DYCJ 96.7 MHz) is an FM station owned and operated by Radio Corporation of the Philippines. Its studios and transmitter are located at Lopez Jaena St., Tacloban.

References

External links
One FM FB Page
One FM Tacloban FB Page

Radio stations in Tacloban